Michael Wallace (or Mike or Mick)  may refer to:

Politics
Michael Wallace (politician) (died 1831), Scottish-born merchant, judge and political figure in Nova Scotia
Mick Wallace (born 1955), Irish politician, football manager and property developer
Mike Wallace (politician) (born 1963), Canadian politician

Sports
Mike Wallace (baseball) (born 1951), American baseball player
Mike Wallace (racing driver) (born 1959), race car driver
Mike Wallace (American football) (born 1986), American football wide receiver
Mick Wallace (born 1955), Irish politician, football manager and property developer
Red Wallace (Michael Wallace, 1918–1977), American professional basketball player
Mick Wallace (footballer), English footballer

Other people
Michael Wallace (piper) ( late 1800s), Irish musician
Michael Wallace (lawyer) (born 1951), U.S. lawyer
Michael Wallace (1961–2000), a murder victim who was poisoned by Stacey Castor
Mike Wallace (1918–2012), American television correspondent
Mike Wallace (historian) (born 1942), American historian

See also
Michael Wallis (born 1945), American historian